Michael Cleere (born 10 November 1960) is an Irish retired hurler who played for Kilkenny Championship club O'Loughlin Gaels. He played for the Kilkenny senior hurling team for a brief period, during which time he usually lined out as a forward.

References

1960 births
Living people
O'Loughlin Gaels hurlers
Kilkenny inter-county hurlers